This list of highest military decorations is an index to articles that describe the highest military decoration awarded by each country in the world.

Notes

References

Courage awards

highest military decorations